Bhairav is a Hindustani classical raga of Bhairav thaat. It is a sampurna raga that is traditionally performed in the morning and also as the beginning piece in concerts. It is the defining raga of its own Thaat.

Raga Kalingda in Hindustani and Ragam Mayamalavagowla in Carnatic music have the same scale as Raga Bhairav, although the moods they create can be quite different due to the way they are expounded.

According to Indian classical vocalist Pandit Jasraj, Bhairav is a "morning raga, and solemn peacefulness is its ideal mood." It is grave in mood and suggests seriousness, introversion and devotional attitude.

History 
Bhairav raga is an ancient raga that is considered to be extremely old and originated many centuries ago. The origin of Bhairav raga is disputed. According to some musicians, Bhairav raga was the first raga that originated from the mouth of Lord Shiva. While some musicians argue that Bhairav raga originated from the mouth of Lord Surya. This is why it was sung in the daytime. Bhairava is one of the names of Shiva especially in his powerful form as a naked ascetic with matted locks and body smeared with ashes. The ragas too have some of these masculine and ascetic attributes in their form and compositions.

The Bhairav raga itself is extremely vast and allows a huge number of note combinations and a great range of emotional qualities from valor to peace. There are many variations based on it including (but not restricted to) Ahir Bhairav, Alam Bhairav, Anand Bhairav, Bairagi Bhairav, Mohini Bhairav Beehad Bhairav, Bhavmat Bhairav, Devata Bhairav, Gauri Bhairav, Hijaz Bhairav, Shivmat Bhairav, Nat Bhairav, Bibhas, Ramkali, Gunkali, Zeelaf, Jogiya (raga), Saurashtra Bhairav, Bangal Bhairav, Komal Bhairav, Mangal Bhairav, Kaushi Bhairav, Bhatiyari Bhairav, Beehad Bhairav, Virat Bhairav, Kabiri Bhairav, Prabhat Bhairav, Roopkali, Bakula Bhairav, Hussaini Bhairav, Kalingda, Devaranjani, Asa Bhairav, Jaun Bhairav, and Bhairav.

Theory 
Bhairav is grave in mood and suggests seriousness, introversion as well as devotional attitude. It shares its notes with Ahir Bhairav which has a sombre temperament.

Arohana : Sa  Ga Ma Pa  Ni Sa'

Avarohana : Sa' Ni  Pa Ma Ga  Sa

Vadi : 

Samavadi : 

Pakad : Ga Ma   Pa, Ga Ma   Sa

Chalan : Sa Ga Ma Pa   Pa Ma Ga Ma  Sa

Organisation and relationships 
Related ragas:
 Ahir Bhairav
 Bairagi Bhairav
 Bibhas
 Gunkali
 Jogiya (raga)
 Mohini Bhairav
 Nat Bhairav
 Ramkali
 Zeelaf

Behaviour 
The performance for this raga is solemnly serious. The raga comes across as a musical entity with mood of meditation, philosophical depth, and emotional richness.

Samay (time) 
Bhairav is an early morning (pratham prahar) raag.

Seasonality 
Bhairav is one of few ragas that can be sung in any season.

Rasa 
Bhairav is typically performed with a peaceful, serious, and serene mood.

Film songs 
Bhairav is a popular raga for film songs. Here are some film songs based on Bhairav:
 "Amma Roti De Baba Roti De" – Sansar, 1952
 "Hanse Tim Tim" – Sansar, 1952
 "Mohe Bhul Gaye Sanvariya" – Baiju Bawra, 1952
 "Jaago, Mohan Pyare Jaago" – Jagte Raho, 1956
 "Man Re Hari Ke Gun Ga" – Musafir, 1957
 "Meri Veena Tum Bin Roye" – Dekh Kabira Roya, 1957
 "Kehe Do Koi Na Kare Yahan Pyaar" – Goonj Uthi Shehnai, 1959
 Waqt Karta Jo Wafa" – Dil Ne Pukara, 1967

References

Sources

External links 
 More details about raga Bhairav

Hindustani ragas
Ragas in the Guru Granth Sahib